Rogers is an unincorporated community in Wolfe County, Kentucky. Rogers has a post office with ZIP code 41365. Rogers Elementary School, a K-6 school in the Wolfe County Schools district, is located in Rogers.

History
A post office has been in operation at Rogers since 1900. The community has the name of early blacksmith Elihu Rogers.

References

Unincorporated communities in Wolfe County, Kentucky
Unincorporated communities in Kentucky